Randall Kevin Sidler (born February 4, 1956) is a former professional American football player. Sidler was selected by the New York Jets in the 5th round of the 1978 NFL Draft but never played an NFL game.  He left the Jets training camp and took a break from football.  The Washington Redskins then traded for him, but he did not represent them either.

He was named All-America in 1977 after amassing 65 tackles and four sacks during his career as a nose guard at Penn State.

Sidler is a graduate Danville High School in Danville, Pennsylvania where his football jersey has been retired.

References

1956 births
Living people
People from Bloomsburg, Pennsylvania
People from Danville, Pennsylvania
Players of American football from Pennsylvania
American football defensive tackles
Penn State Nittany Lions football players